Diana Schmiemann (born 2 March 1972 in Wickede-Wimbern, North Rhine-Westphalia, West Germany) is a retired German rhythmic gymnast.

She competed for West Germany in the rhythmic gymnastics all-around competition at the 1988 Summer Olympics in Seoul, placing 8th overall.

References

External links 
 

1972 births
Living people
German rhythmic gymnasts
Gymnasts at the 1988 Summer Olympics
Olympic gymnasts of West Germany
Sportspeople from Arnsberg (region)
People from Soest (district)